Wilka is a village in Gmina Sulików, Zgorzelec County, Lower Silesian Voivodeship, Poland.

Wilka may also refer to:

Wilka-Bory, a village in Gmina Sulików, Zgorzelec County, Lower Silesian Voivodeship, Poland
Patricia Wilka (born 1972), Paraguayan pistol shooter
William Wilka (born 1947), Paraguayan sports shooter

See also
 Wilkas